West Ranch High School is a public high school in the William S. Hart Union High School District located in Stevenson Ranch, California. The school mascot is the Wildcat, and navy blue and gold are the school's official colors. The Paw Print is the school's official newspaper.

During its first year of operation (2004-2005 school year), the school was located on the campus of Rancho Pico Junior High School, housing only 9th grade students and faculty. It has since moved to its own campus, housing students 9th through 12th grade. The class of 2008 was the first graduating class in the history of the high school.

West Ranch High School has been the filming site for several television shows and movies, including The Unit and the movie Stay Cool.

Student demographics

As of the 2021-22 academic year, 2,209 students were enrolled at West Ranch High School. 40.7% of students were non-Hispanic white, 26.1% were Asian American, 22.6% were Hispanic, and 3.9% were African American. As of 2020-21, 344 students (15.5%) were eligible for free or reduced-price lunch.

Notable alumni

Jake Bird (born 1995), baseball pitcher for the Colorado Rockies

References

External links

Educational institutions established in 2004
Public high schools in Los Angeles County, California
2004 establishments in California